The Radiophysical Research Institute (NIRFI), based in Nizhny Novgorod, Russia, is a research institute that conducts basic and applied research in the field of radiophysics, radio astronomy, cosmology and radio engineering. It is also known for its work in solar physics, sun-earth physics as well as the related geophysics. It also does outreach for the Russian education system. It was formed in 1956 as the Radiophysical Research Institute of the (Soviet) Ministry of Education and Science.

Projects NIRFI 

 Sura Ionospheric Heating Facility
 Zimenkovsky radio-astronomical observatory
 Radio telescope - RT-14 laboratories NIRFI Staraya Pustin + two RT-7

References

Further reading
  254 pages.

Astrophysics
Radio astronomy
Astronomy in Russia
History of science and technology in Russia
Physics institutes
Research institutes in Russia
Research institutes in the Soviet Union
1956 establishments in the Soviet Union
Astronomy in the Soviet Union
Research institutes established in 1956